John Knyvet (1358/9–1418), of Mendlesham, Suffolk, was an English Member of Parliament for Huntingdonshire in September 1397.

He was the son of John Knyvet (d.1381) that was the Lord Chancellor of England in 1372–1377 and his wife Eleanor (d.1388), the daughter of Sir Ralph Basset (d.1341) of Weldon, Northamptonshire.

By 1377 he had married Joan (d.c.1417), daughter and heiress of Sir John Boutetout (d. by 1377) of Mendlesham by his wife Katherine. He married secondly Joan (d.c.1429).

By his first wife Joan Boutetout he was the father of a younger John Knyvett who was M.P. for Northamptonshire in 1421.

References

1358 births
1418 deaths
14th-century English people
English MPs September 1397
Politicians from Suffolk